The San Mateo County Transit District (SamTrans) fleet of buses has operated throughout San Mateo County since 1976, after county voters approved the formation of samTrans in 1974 to merge 11 predecessor municipal bus systems.

Summary

, SamTrans operates a total of 379 vehicles in revenue service. SamTrans has two maintenance facilities for its fixed-route bus fleet. SamTrans headquarters are in San Carlos, California, one block southwest from the  Caltrain station. In addition, two facilities are used by its paratransit operator, MV Transportation: one at Brewster Depot in Redwood City, and another facility in Half Moon Bay.

Livery

The samTrans livery is predominantly white with red and blue stripes. Early buses featured linear horizontal stripes, and starting with the 2009 Gillig BRTs, the stripes are curved along the sides. A new variant of the livery was introduced later; the base color is silver, instead of white, and the blue stripe extends from below the front door to the beltline at the rear, with a red stripe starting from the headlight and flowing up to the roof.

Fixed-route fleet
Under the California Air Resources Board Innovative Clean Transit regulation adopted in December 2018, public transit agencies in California will gradually transition to a zero-emission bus fleet by 2040. SamTrans has set a goal of transitioning to an all-electric fleet by 2032. SamTrans considers fixed-route vehicles to have a service lifetime of 12 years.

Current

On order

Retired

Notes

See also
 San Francisco Municipal Railway fleet

References

External links
 
 
 

Fleet
Bus transportation in California
Public transportation in San Mateo County, California
Public transportation in Santa Clara County, California
Public transportation in San Francisco